Senator Egan may refer to:

Charles M. Egan (1877–1955), New Jersey State Senate
Dennis Egan (born 1947), Democratic member of the Alaska State Senate
Michael J. Egan (1926–2016), American lawyer and politician
Michael Egan (Wisconsin politician) (1827–?), Wisconsin State Senate